Hüsnüşah Hatun ( "Beauty of the Sah", died  1513), called also Hüsnişah Hatun, was a consort of Sultan Bayezid II of the Ottoman Empire.

Family
Hüsnüşah Hatun was the daughter of Nasuh Bey, the maternal grandson of Ibrahim II Bey, ruler of the Karamanids, and the governor of İçil. She had two brothers named Pir Ahmed Bey, and Abdülkerim Bey.

Marriage
Hüsnüşah entered Bayezid's harem when he was still a prince, and the governor of Amasya sanjak. She gave birth to two children, a son, Şehzade Şehinşah in 1474, and a daughter, Sultanzade Sultan.

According to Turkish tradition, all princes were expected to work as provincial governors as a part of their training. In 1481 Şehinşah, was sent to Manisa sanjak, and then in 1485 to Karaman, and Hüsnüşah accompanied him. She built and endowed a mosque in 1490, and Kurşunlu Han in 1497 at Manisa. She also made several endowments in memory of her ancestors.

After Şehzade Şehinşah's execution in 1511, Hüsnüşah in a letter reported that she had been rendered crazy following his execution, defended his innocence, and requested that a mausoleum be built in his memory. She also corresponded with Selim I, Şehinşah's victorious brother, on behalf of Mevlana Pir Ahmed Çelebi, a scholar who had been at Şehinşah's court and who was neglected when the members of the prince's household were assigned new posts.

Issue
From Bayezid II, Hüsnüşah Hatun had a daughter and a son: 
Sultanzade Sultan (Amasya, before 1474 -?)
Şehzade Şehinşah (Amasya, 1474 - Karaman, 1511). He had a consort, Mukrime Hatun, mother of a son, Şehzade Mehmed Şah, who married his paternal cousin Şahnisa Sultan, daughter of Şehzade Abdullah (son of Bayezid II and Şirin Hatun) and his wife Nergiszade Ferahşad Sultan (daughter of Şehzade Mustafa, son of Mehmed II).

Death
Hüsnüşah Hatun died at Bursa in 1513, and was buried in Muradiye Complex.

References

Sources

15th-century consorts of Ottoman sultans
Year of birth unknown
Year of death unknown
16th-century consorts of Ottoman sultans